Girl with Hair Ribbon is a 1965 pop art painting, by Roy Lichtenstein. It was purchased by the Museum of Contemporary Art in Tokyo, for  $6 million. This artwork was created using magna and oil paint.

See also
 1965 in art

Notes

External links
Lichtenstein Foundation website
Masterworks: American Painting of the 1950s and 60s, Girl With Hair Ribbon, 1965 directed by Reiner Moritz, 1938-, in Masterworks: American Painting of the 1950s and 60s (Germany: ArtHaus Musik, 1988), 10 mins

1965 paintings
Paintings by Roy Lichtenstein
Paintings in Japan